Fair Districts Amendment is a 2010 amendment to the Constitution of Florida.

References

Citations

Bibliography
 

Politics of Florida
2010 in Florida